Haringsee is a town in the district of Gänserndorf in the Austrian state of Lower Austria.

Geography
About 20 km north lies Gänserndorf, about the same distance east lies Marchegg, south is Hainburg and west is Vienna.

References

Cities and towns in Gänserndorf District